Kim Schoonbaert (born 2 March 1986) is a road cyclist from Belgium. She participated at the 2012 UCI Road World Championships in the Women's team time trial for Lotto Belisol Ladiesteam.

References

External links
 profile at Procyclingstats.com

1986 births
Belgian female cyclists
Living people
Place of birth missing (living people)